Massachusetts House of Representatives' 2nd Berkshire district in the United States is one of 160 legislative districts included in the lower house of the Massachusetts General Court. It covers parts of Berkshire County and Franklin County. Democrat Paul Mark of Peru has represented the district since 2011. Mark is running unopposed for re-election in the 2020 Massachusetts general election.

Towns represented
The district includes the following localities:
 Bernardston
 Charlemont
 Colrain
 Dalton
 Greenfield
 Hawley
 Heath
 Hinsdale
 Leyden
 Monroe
 Northfield
 Peru
 Pittsfield
 Rowe
 Savoy
 Windsor

The current district geographic boundary overlaps with those of the Massachusetts Senate's Berkshire, Hampshire, Franklin and Hampden and Hampshire, Franklin and Worcester districts.

Former locales
The district previously covered:
 Adams, circa 1872 
 Cheshire, circa 1872 
 Clarksburg, circa 1872 
 Florida, circa 1872

Representatives
 Russell C. Brown, circa 1858 
 Sylvander Johnson, circa 1858 
 William H. Tyler, 2d, circa 1859 
 John Milton Morin, circa 1888 
 William H. Woodhead, circa 1920 
 Richard August Ruether, circa 1951 
 Anthony P. McBride, circa 1975 
 Sherwood Guernsey, circa 1990
 Shaun P. Kelly, 1991–2005
 Denis Guyer, 2005–2011
 Paul W. Mark, 2011-current

See also
 Other Berkshire County districts of the Massachusetts House of Representatives: 1st, 3rd, 4th
 List of Massachusetts House of Representatives elections
 List of Massachusetts General Courts
 List of former districts of the Massachusetts House of Representatives

Images

References

External links
 Ballotpedia
  (State House district information based on U.S. Census Bureau's American Community Survey).
 League of Women Voters of Williamstown

House
Government of Berkshire County, Massachusetts
Government of Franklin County, Massachusetts